The Zona Gale House is a historic house located at 506 West Edgewater Street in Portage, Wisconsin. It is locally and generally significant for its association with literature and unique architecture.

Description and history 
The -story house was built by Zona Gale in 1906 as a gift to her parents; Gale was the first woman to win the Pulitzer Prize for Drama. It is located in Portage, Wisconsin. The house was added to the National Register of Historic Places in 1980 for its significance in literature and architecture.

References

Houses on the National Register of Historic Places in Wisconsin
Houses in Columbia County, Wisconsin
Portage, Wisconsin
National Register of Historic Places in Columbia County, Wisconsin
Houses completed in 1906
1906 establishments in Wisconsin